Macalister is an electoral district of the Legislative Assembly in the Australian state of Queensland. It was created in the 2017 redistribution, and was first contested at the 2017 Queensland state election. It is named after the second Queensland Premier, Arthur Macalister.

Located in Logan City, Macalister consists of the suburbs of Bahrs Scrub, Bannockburn, Beenleigh, Carbrook, Cornubia, Eagleby, Edens Landing, Holmview, Mount Warren Park, Windaroo and parts of the suburbs of Loganholme and Waterford.

It takes in areas from the previous districts of Albert, Coomera, Redlands, Springwood and Waterford.

Based on the results from the 2015 Queensland state election, Macalister was estimated to be a fairly safe seat for the Labor Party with a margin of 6.4% in the leadup to the 2017 Queensland state election.

Members for Macalister

Election results

See also
 Electoral districts of Queensland
 Members of the Queensland Legislative Assembly by year
 :Category:Members of the Queensland Legislative Assembly by name

References

Electoral districts of Queensland